Japan women's national floorball team is the national team of Japan. At the 1997 Floorball Women's World Championship in Godby and Mariehamn, Åland, Finland, the team finished tenth. At the 1999 Floorball Women's World Championship in Borlänge, Sweden, the team finished fourth in the B-Division. At the 2001 Floorball Women's World Championship in Riga, Latvia, the team finished fifth in the B-Division. At the 2003 Floorball Women's World Championship in Germany, the team finished first in the B-Division. At the 2005 Floorball Women's World Championship in Singapore, the team finished eighth in the A-Division. At the 2007 Floorball Women's World Championship in Frederikshavn, Denmark, the team finished sixth in the B-Division. At the 2013 Floorball Women's World Championship in Brno and Ostrava, Czech Republic, the team finished fifteenth.

References 

Women's national floorball teams
Women's national sports teams of Japan